Nathan Triplett (born March 15, 1987) is a former American football linebacker. After playing college football for Minnesota, he was drafted by the Minnesota Vikings in the fifth round of the 2010 NFL Draft. He has also been a member of the San Diego Chargers and Indianapolis Colts.

Early years
Triplett played in the Wright County Conference, graduating from Delano High School, in Delano, Minnesota, in 2005.

College career
Triplett attended the University of Minnesota, where he initially was a special teams force and eventually worked his way into a dominant linebacker. In his senior season, in the first game of the year, he had possibly a game-saving interception, when vs Syracuse University in overtime he intercepted a pass in the Gophers own end zone to end the possession and give the Gophers the ball. The Gophers kicked a  field goal on their possession to win the game. The next week vs United States Air Force Academy, with about 12 minutes left in the game, he recovered a fumble and returned it 52 yards for a touchdown, to break the 10-10 tie. The game ended at 20-13, so his touchdown was the game winner.

Professional career

Minnesota Vikings
Triplett was selected by the Minnesota Vikings in the fifth round (167th overall) of the 2010 NFL Draft. He was signed to a contract on June 14, 2010.
He was released on August 31, 2010, as a part of preseason cuts.

San Diego Chargers
On October 5, 2010, the San Diego Chargers signed Triplett to the practice squad.

Indianapolis Colts
On December 1, 2010, the Indianapolis Colts signed the free agent rookie to their active roster. He was waived on October 5, 2011.

Tampa Bay Buccaneers
On July 29, 2012, the Tampa Bay Buccaneers signed Triplett, after releasing Dezmon Briscoe two days earlier. He was placed on the exempt/left squad list after leaving the team on August 2.

References

External links
Tampa Bay Buccaneers bio
San Diego Chargers bio
Minnesota Golden Gophers football bio

1987 births
Living people
People from Maple Plain, Minnesota
Players of American football from Minnesota
Sportspeople from the Minneapolis–Saint Paul metropolitan area
American football linebackers
Minnesota Golden Gophers football players
Minnesota Vikings players
San Diego Chargers players
Indianapolis Colts players
Tampa Bay Buccaneers players